Tom Johnstone (born 13 August 1995) is an England international rugby league footballer who plays as a er for Catalans Dragons in the Super League.

He has spent time on loan from Wakefield at Featherstone Rovers in the Championship. Johnstone was the winner of the Super League Young Player of the Year in 2016.

Background
Johnstone was born in Germany and is of Scottish descent.

With his father in the Army, Johnstone was born in Germany. Johnstone has lived in England since he was very young; as a junior, he played for Stanningley Amateur Rugby League Club. He attended Pudsey Grangefield School and represented the City of Leeds sprinting team at Indoor athletics.

Playing career
Johnstone plays at Wing or Centre. He is noted as one of the fastest players in the game. He has also represented England at under 19's level. He made his professional début for Wakefield Trinity against Leeds in 2014 during a Boxing day friendly at Headingley.  He made his full Super League début for an injury-hit Wakefield Trinity side in their 2015 Round 7 defeat by Wigan. He played 13 times in his first season at Wakefield Trinity, scoring 9 tries. He scored his first Wakefield Trinity try against St Helens in a 44-4 defeat. In his second season 2016 he scored one length of the field effort that was considered to be the try of the season.

The Wakefield Trinity club signed him up on a long four-season deal, an unprecedented step by the club.  Arguably the brightest young talent in English Rugby League, Johnstone is widely regarded as one of the fastest players in the Super League if not the fastest and is without a doubt one of the best finishers.  Johnstone received his first International call up against France in 2018, he scored a sensational hat-trick of tries on his debut.  Johnstone was one of the favourites in 2019 to become Super League's top try-scorer and he appeared well motivated to achieve that accolade until injury struck.
In round 1 of the 2021 Super League season, Johnstone scored two tries and received the man of the match award in Wakefield's 28–22 loss against Leeds.

On 5 July 2022, Johnstone signed a two-year deal to join the Catalans Dragons starting on 2023.
On 15 July 2022, Johnstone was ruled out for the remainder of the 2022 Super League season with a groin injury.

International career
In 2018 he was selected for England against France at the Leigh Sports Village.

Injuries
Johnstone has suffered two career-threatening anterior cruciate ligament (ACL) knee injuries, one in each leg. The first was in 2017, the second was in 2019 from which he recovered in time to take part in 2020's Super League XXV.

References

External links

Wakefield Trinity profile
Tom Johnstone at wakefieldwildcats.co.uk
SL profile

1995 births
Living people
Catalans Dragons players
England national rugby league team players
English people of Scottish descent
English rugby league players
Featherstone Rovers players
Rugby league centres
Rugby league wingers
Wakefield Trinity players